Michel Lang (9 June 1939 – 24 April 2014) was a French film and television director, best remembered for his comedy films in the late 1970s and 1980s. After 1990, he directed predominantly for French television.

Filmography
 1964 : Un tout autre visage
 1976 : À nous les petites Anglaises with Sophie Barjac and Rémi Laurent
 1977 : Une fille cousue de fil blanc with Aude Landry and Serge Reggiani
 1978 : L'Hôtel de la plage with Sophie Barjac and Myriam Boyer
 1980 : Tous vedettes with Leslie Caron
 1981 : On n'est pas des anges... elles non plus with Sabine Azéma and Georges Beller
 1982 : Le Cadeau with Pierre Mondy and Claudia Cardinale
 1984 : L'Étincelle
 1985 : À nous les garçons with Sophie Carle and  Franck Dubosc
 1987 : Club de rencontres with Francis Perrin and Jean-Paul Comart
 1991 : Duplex (TV)
 1991 : Mascarade (TV)
 1992 : Le Fils d'un autre (TV)
 1992 : Softwar (Mord im Atomkraftwerk) (TV)
 1992 : Un mort très convenable (TV)
 1994 : Les Faucons (TV)
 1995 : Baldipata (TV) with Annie Cordy and Charles Aznavour
 1995 : Bébé coup de foudre (TV)
 1997 : Sans cérémonie (TV) with Annie Cordy and Charles Aznavour
 2002 : Louis et les enfants perdus (TV)

External links

1939 births
2014 deaths
French television directors
Film directors from Paris